Qiamdasht (also Romanized as Qīāmdasht) is a village in Khavaran-e Sharqi Rural District of Khavaran District of Ray County, Tehran province, Iran. At the 2006 National Census, its population was 40,396 in 9,781 households. The following census in 2011 counted 38,790 people in 10,636 households. The latest census in 2016 showed a population of 36,446 people in 10,471 households; it was the largest village in its rural district.

References 

Ray County, Iran

Populated places in Tehran Province

Populated places in Ray County, Iran